Coins of the Indian rupee (INR) were first minted in 1950. New coins have been produced annually since then and they make up a valuable aspect of the Indian currency system. Today, circulating coins exist in denominations of One Rupee, Two Rupees, Five Rupees, Ten Rupees and Twenty Rupees. All of these are produced by four mints located across India, in Kolkata, Mumbai, Hyderabad, Noida.

History
After Indian independence in 1947, British Indian coins were in use as a frozen currency until the dominion of India became a republic in 1950. The first rupee coins of the Republic of India were minted in 1950. These included 1/2 rupee, 1/4 rupee, 2 anna, 1 anna, 1/2 anna & 1 pice coins, and are referred to as the anna series or pre-decimal coinage. Under the anna series, one rupee was divided into 16 annas or 64 pice, with each anna equal to 4 pice.

In 1957, India shifted to the decimal system, though for a short period of time, both decimal and non-decimal coins were in circulation. To distinguish between the two pice coins in circulation, the coins minted between 1957 and 1964 were printed with the legend “Naya Paisa” (“New Paisa”). The denominations in circulation were 1, 2, 3, 5, 10, 20, 25, 50 (naya) paisa and one rupee. Since rupees retained their pre-decimal value, pre-decimal coins of one, half and quarter rupees remained in circulation after decimalisation.

The word "naya" was dropped in 1964 and a new denomination, the 3 paisa, was introduced into circulation. A 20 paisa coin was minted in 1968. Neither of these coins gained much popularity. The 1, 2 and 3 paisa coins were phased out gradually in the 1970s. In 1982, a new 2 rupee coin was introduced experimentally to replace 2 rupee notes. The 2 rupee coin was not minted again till 1990, after which it was minted every following year.

Stainless steel coinage of 10, 25 and 50 paisa was introduced in 1988. In 1992, a new stainless steel rupee coin, smaller and lighter than the older rupee, was minted, alongside a 5 rupee Cupronickel coin.

In 2005, the 10 rupee coin was minted for the first time. Higher denomination coins were introduced due to an increasing demand for change and the increasing cost of printing 2, 5 and 10 rupee banknotes.

On 30 June 2011, all coins in denominations of 25 paisa and below were officially demonetised.

Commemorative coins in circulation can be found in various denominations. They depict various special events or people, including Mahatma Gandhi, Jawaharlal Nehru, Indira Gandhi, B. R. Ambedkar, Rajiv Gandhi, Dnyaneshwar, the 1982 Asian Games, Sardar Vallabhbhai Patel, Subhas Chandra Bose, Sri Aurobindo, Chittaranjan Das, Chhatrapati Shivaji, the 2010 Commonwealth Games, Bhagat Singh, Rabindranath Tagore, Atal Bihari Vajpayee, Jallianwala Bagh massacre etc.

Coin series: 1947–1957 (pre-decimalization)

Union of India 1947–1950 

At Independence on 15 August 1947, India was partitioned into the new Dominion of India and Dominion of Pakistan. The new Dominion (or Union) of India retained the previous imperial currency with the portrait of King George VI. The basic unit of currency was the Indian rupee, which was itself divided into annas (16 annas to a rupee) and pice (the old spelling of paisa - 64 pice to a rupee).  The lowest-denomination Indian coins, the half-pice (128 to a rupee) and the pie (192 to a rupee) were officially demonetized in 1947; while both denominations had continued to circulate up to that time, new examples were not minted after 1942 as they were practically worthless (India remained a member of the sterling area after independence and the rupee remained pegged to the pound sterling. Until 1966, the rupee was worth 1s.6d, or 18 old British pence; a half-pice was therefore worth 0.141 old pence and a pie 0.09 old pence.)

From 15 August 1947 until 26 January 1950, the Indian coinage structure was as follows:

(bold - denominations minted by the Government of India)

This represented the currency arrangements during the transition period up to the establishment of the Republic of India.

The British India coins which were mostly in circulation from 1947 to 1950 until the first Republic of India (Pre-decimalization Series) coins were introduced as follows:

Republic of India 1950-1957 

On 26 January 1950, India became an independent republic in the Commonwealth of Nations. This series was introduced on 15 August 1950 and represented the first coinage of Republic of India. The British King's portrait was replaced by the Lion Capital of the Ashoka Pillar. A corn sheaf replaced the Tiger on the one rupee coin. In some ways this symbolised a shift in focus to progress and prosperity. Indian motifs were incorporated on other coins. The previous monetary system and the old units of currency were retained unchanged.

Decimalization

The move towards decimalization was afoot for over a century. However, it was in September, 1955 that the Indian Coinage Act was amended for the country to adopt a metric system for coinage. The Act came into force with effect from 1 April 1957, after which anna and pice denominations were demonetised. The rupee remained unchanged in value and nomenclature. It, however, was now divided into 100 'paisa' instead of 16 annas or 64 pice. Effective from 30 June 2011, all coins in denominations of 25 paisa and below were officially demonetized.

Coin series 1957–present (decimal)

Naya paisa series 1957–1963 

The antiquated spelling of "pice" was modified to "paisa" in the singular and "paise" in the plural. For public recognition, the new decimal paisa was termed 'Naya Paisa' (New Paisa) till 1 June 1964 when the term 'Naya' was dropped. The coins of 50p, 25p, 10p, 5p, 2p, and 1p had a legend in Devanagari script explaining the value of coin in terms of fraction of a rupee.

Paisa series I with Devanagari Legend 1964 onwards 

In June 1964, the term 'Naya' was dropped and the coins were as fllowsreminted. The legend in Devanagari script explaining the value of coin in terms of fraction of a Rupee continued till it was finally dropped from the new design minted 1964 onwards.

Series II without the Devanagari Legend (1964 - 1983) 

The coin minted from 1965 did not have the legend in Devanagari, explaining the value of the coin as a fraction of the rupee. Small-denomination coins which were formerly made of bronze, nickel-brass, cupro-nickel and aluminium-bronze were gradually minted in aluminium. The first coin minted in such type was the 3 paisa coin in 1964, which was a new denomination, and continued to be minted till 1971. One and Two paisa coins were changed to aluminium and were minted without the Devanagari legend from 1965. 20 paisa coin was introduced in 1968, which continued to be minted till 1971.

Series III 1982 Onwards 

From 1982, New series was launched. the 20 paisa coin which was last minted in 1971, was reintroduced again, but in Aluminium. The size and the design of 10 paisa, 50 paisa and 1 rupee was changed, though they continued to be minted in the same metal. Coins of 3p, 2p and 1p were discontinued but continued to be the legal tender.

Series IV 1988 Onwards 

In Series IV, 5 paisa and 20 paisa coins were discontinued though they continued to be minted in Series III till 1994 and 1997 respectively. 10 paisa, 25 paisa and 50 paisa coins were minted in Stainless Steel. 1992 onwards, 1 Re coin was also minted in Steel and ₹2 and ₹5 coins in Copper Nickel were introduced. The very considerable costs of managing note issues of ₹1, ₹2, and ₹5 led to the gradual coinage of these denominations. These coins continued to be minted till 2004, when the Unity in diversity series was launched.

Cupro-Nickel coins are not minted anymore. Ferritic Stainless Steel coins of Two and Five Rupee denominations are currently in production.

2004 Unity in diversity Series 

In 2004, RBI issued a series in denominations of 1 rupee, followed by 2 rupee and 10 rupee in 2005. These issues however came into circulation in 2006, and created a controversy over their design. 10 rupee coins were the first bimetallic coins issued in India, and because of the controversy and being minted in only one mint, most of the coinage never found its way into circulation. The ones which did were hoarded by Coin collectors and Coin hoarders.

2007 Hasta Mudra Series 

In 2007 RBI issued a new series of Coins, The Hasta Mudra Series, in coins of 50 paisa, 1 rupee and 2 rupee denominations. These coins are stainless steel and feature various Hasta Mudras (hand gestures in Indian Classical dance). The 5 rupee piece that features waves in its design was also issued in 2007, along with a new 10 rupee coin. However, the design of the 10 rupee piece changed in 2008. The 5 rupee coin design was again reverted to the previous design, though it was issued in Nickel-brass instead of Copper-nickel. However, these 5 rupee and 10 rupee coins were not the part of the Hasta Mudra series.

2007 Common Circulation Series 
The 5 rupee and 10 rupee coins were issued for common circulation in 2007, 2008, 2009 with changed designs and continued to be minted until the introduction of the Rupee Symbol series in 2011.

2011 Series with the Rupee Symbol (₹) 

In 2011, RBI issued a series in denominations of 50p, ₹1, ₹2, ₹5, and ₹10. The 50p, ₹1, ₹2, and ₹5 designs are identical except the absence of the rupee symbol in 50p coin. The ₹10 coin continued to be issued in bimetallic issues as previously.

2019 Grain Series 
The Ministry of Finance has issued a notification on March 6 announcing the launch of 5 new coins in the country, namely the new 1, 2, 5, 10 and 20. The new series of coins are accessible to those with visual impairments and have an enhanced design. The coins were launched by PM Narendra Modi and Finance Minister Arun Jaitley. The design of the coins were prepared by the National Institute of Design while Security Printing and Minting Corporation of India Limited and the Ministry of Finance played the key role in the introduction of new coins in the country.

Various new features have been incorporated in the new series of circulation coins to make them more easy for the visually impaired people to use. The coins are characterized by increasing size and weight from lower to higher denominations from 1 to 20. All of the denominations would be of round shape, except the newly included coin of 20, which will be a 12 sided coin with no serrations.

Mints 
Each currency coin minted in India (and anywhere in the world) has a special mint mark on it to identify the mint.

Domestic Mint Marks

Foreign Mint Marks 
Due to the increasing demand for the circulation of coins, the Indian government was forced to mint coins in foreign countries at various points in the country's history.

Commemorative coins

The first Indian commemorative coin was issued in 1964 in remembrance of Jawaharlal Nehru's birth anniversary. Since then, numerous coins from 5 paise (INR 0.05) to ₹1000 (INR 1000.00) have been issued. These coins based on birth or death centenary of famous personalities or on recently died, commemoration of special government programs or sport events, anniversaries of historical incidents, government organisation etc.

List of Commemorative Coins 

Note: Bold Marks are Silver Coins, Mint index: K = Kolkata (no mark), H = Hyderabad (⋆), M = Mumbai (◆ or B), Noida = (●).

Controversies

Controversy over 2006 two-rupee coin

The two-rupee coin issued from 2006 by the Reserve Bank, in stark contrast to the earlier coin, is rounded and simpler in design, without the map of India. The coin has already been criticized for being difficult to recognize by the visually impaired.

Most controversially, it features an equal-armed cross with the beams divided into two rays and with dots between adjacent beams. According to RBI, this design represents "four heads sharing a common body" under a new "unity in diversity" theme. 

However, people have charged that the symbol is a Christian cross resembling the symbol on the deniers issued by Louis the Pious.

See also 

 Indian rupee
 Coinage of India

References

External links
Reserve Bank of India Coinage Museum 
Reserve Bank of India Paper Money 
www.indian-coins.com
A blog on Antiques & Collectibles 
India Coin News & Forums 

Coins of India